Body of Evidence is a 1993 erotic thriller film directed by Uli Edel, written by Brad Mirman, and starring Madonna and Willem Dafoe, with Joe Mantegna, Anne Archer, Julianne Moore, and Jürgen Prochnow in supporting roles.

Madonna's performance in the film was panned by film critics and it marked her fourth film acting performance to be panned, following Shanghai Surprise, Who's That Girl, and Bloodhounds of Broadway.

In France and Japan, the film was released under the name Body. In Japan, Madonna's other 1993 film Dangerous Game was released there as Body II even though the films have nothing in common nor are related to each other in narrative.

Plot
The elderly and wealthy Andrew Marsh dies from complications stemming from an erotic incident involving bondage and homemade pornography. The main suspect is his lover Rebecca Carlson who proclaims her innocence to lawyer Frank Dulaney. Initially believing her, Dulaney agrees to represent her.

District Attorney Robert Garrett seeks to prove that Carlson deliberately killed Marsh in bed to receive the $8 million he left her in his will. As the trial begins, Carlson and Dulaney enter a sadomasochistic sexual relationship behind the back of Dulaney's unsuspecting wife, Sharon.

During their first sexual encounter, Carlson secures Dulaney’s arms behind his back using his own belt and alternatively pours hot wax and champagne on him before having sex.

After an ex-lover of Carlson’s, Jeffrey Roston, testifies that he both changed his will to favour her and that she engaged in similar risky sexual behaviour with him, Dulaney attempts to end their affair.

Sharon confronts him about the affair having figured it out from a phone call with Carlson as well as the strange marks on his body from the hot wax. Dulaney goes to Carlson's home and accuses her of telling his wife about them (although Sharon says she worked it out from her tone alone). When Dulaney accidentally knocks her to the ground, Carlson begins to masturbate on the floor in front of him. Carlson pulls out handcuffs, Dulaney forcibly cuffs her hands instead and sexually assaults her. Initially she resists before appearing to enjoy the assault.

Footage from Marsh’s home video reveals that he had an affair with his secretary, Joanne Braslow, who is a key witness against Carlson. He also had previously left Braslow more money in his will before beginning his relationship with Carlson. She says that she was hurt but she loved him and would never hurt him. However, there is evidence that she bought the murder weapon. Carlson suggests to Dulaney that the secretary tried to frame her, but he is now less sure of her innocence in the crime.

Carlson takes the stand and her surprising testimony that Roston had an affair with another man convinces the jury, which acquits her. Before leaving court, she mockingly thanks Dulaney indicating that she may be guilty after all.

Dulaney visits Carlson's home and overhears an incriminating conversation between her and Marsh's doctor, Alan Paley. He confronts the co-conspirators, realizing that it was Paley who supplied the fatal dose of cocaine. Carlson is unconcerned about his discovery, but Paley is upset to find out that she was sleeping with Dulaney as well. Paley realizes she does not care about him and becomes enraged when she tells him she has already forgotten him.

After a struggle with Dulaney who tries to save Carlson, Paley shoots her twice. She plunges from a window to her death. Paley is arrested for murdering her.

Before leaving the scene with his wife to repair their relationship, Dulaney then tells Garret he should've won the case with Garrett replying: "I did".

Cast

Production
Body of Evidence was filmed in Portland, Oregon, with the Pittock Mansion serving as a primary location. The cemetery scene featured in the beginning of the film was shot on location at Lone Fir Cemetery.

Julianne Moore said her nude scene in this movie was "just awful": "I was too young to know better. It was the first time I'd been asked to get naked and it turned out to be completely extraneous and gratuitous."

Release

Box office
Body of Evidence performed poorly at the box office. In its second week it experienced a 60% drop. It grossed $13 million in the United States and Canada and $25 million internationally for a worldwide total of $38 million.

Censorship
The film originally received the rare NC-17 rating from the Motion Picture Association of America. The first theatrical release was censored for the purpose of obtaining an R rating, reducing the film's running time from 101 to 99 minutes.  The video premiere, however, restored the deleted material.

Critical response
Body of Evidence has an 8% rating at Rotten Tomatoes based on 38 reviews, with a rating average of 3.10/10. The critical consensus reads, "Body of Evidence'''s sex scenes may be kinky, but the ludicrous concept is further undone by the ridiculous dialogue." Metacritic assigned the film a weighted average score of 29 out of 100, based on 17 critics, indicating "generally unfavorable reviews". Audiences surveyed by CinemaScore gave the film a grade of "C" on scale of A+ to F. The film appeared on the 2005 list of Roger Ebert's most hated films. The screenplay and performances were especially disparaged. His colleague Gene Siskel called Body of Evidence a "stupid and empty thriller" that is worse than her softcore coffee table book Sex''.

Julianne Moore later regretted acting in the film and went on to call it "a big mistake".

Accolades

References

Sources

External links
 
 
 
 

1993 films
1993 independent films
1993 thriller films
1990s American films
1990s English-language films
1990s erotic thriller films
1990s mystery thriller films
1990s psychological thriller films
American courtroom films
American erotic thriller films
American independent films
American mystery thriller films
American psychological thriller films
BDSM in films
English-language German films
Erotic mystery films
Films about adultery in the United States
Films about lawyers
Films directed by Uli Edel
Films produced by Dino De Laurentiis
Films scored by Graeme Revell
Films set in Portland, Oregon
Films shot in Portland, Oregon
Films with screenplays by Brad Mirman
German courtroom films
German erotic thriller films
German independent films
German mystery thriller films
German psychological thriller films
Golden Raspberry Award winning films
Metro-Goldwyn-Mayer films
1990s German films